Dutchbat (formed from the words "Dutch Battalion", officially known in Dutch as 1 (NL) VN Infanteriebataljon) was a Dutch battalion under the command of the United Nations in operation United Nations Protection Force (UNPROFOR). It was hastily formed out of the emerging Air Mobile Brigade of the Royal Netherlands Armed Forces between February 1994 and November 1995 to participate in peacekeeping operations in the former Yugoslavia. It was tasked to execute United Nations Security Council Resolution 819 in the Bosniak Muslim enclaves and the designated UN "safe zone" of Srebrenica during the Bosnian War.

In July 1995 as the Bosnian Serb forces, under Colonel General Ratko Mladić, came to take over the enclave, Dutchbat was vastly outnumbered and were far too lightly equipped to repel the more heavily armed Bosnian Serb troops. It also had its request for air support to the UNPROFOR denied. Subsequently, the Serb forces, under Mladić's command, led Srebrenica's Bosniak male inhabitants into the mountains, where thousands of them were massacred.

Despite their efforts to secure peace in the area, the enclave fell into Serb hands. In 2016, several veterans of the battalion, with approval of its commander, sued the Dutch government for "severe negligence and carelessness" regarding the mission.

Operation
DUTCHBAT was a Dutch army battalion. Its mission consisted of deploying four successive rotations, each of around 450 persons, named "Dutchbat I, -II, -III and -IV". The Dutch troops were armed with personal weapons, machine guns and two anti-tank RPGs, in accordance with the UN mandate of UNPROFOR. The headquarters were installed in an old battery factory in Potočari,  from Srebrenica. DUTCHBAT used 30 observation posts (OPs) throughout the perimeter of the enclave, mostly consisting of a sandbagged armored car and associated personnel and equipment.

UNPROFOR's mission was to execute United Nations Security Council Resolution 819 in the Bosniak Muslim enclave (dubbed a "secure area" or "safe haven" by the UN). The Rules of Engagement (ROE) stated that the peacekeepers could use force for self-defence only. They relied on air support from NATO. Intervening in the fighting was forbidden to all NATO and UN troops. In accordance to resolution 819 phrase 10;  Resolution 819 demanded that all parties ensure the safety of the Protection Force, United Nations personnel and other international organisations. The Netherlands placed a battalion of the Airborne Brigade at the disposal of UNPROFOR. The main force of the battalion (… Dutchbat) was stationed in the Srebrenica enclave." DUTCHBAT's zone fell under siege by the VRS when NATO air forces began bombing the Bosnian Serbs besieging Sarajevo.

Events

Described as "a sleepy cul de sac" because of its geographic location in a valley enclosed by hills and mountains, the Srebrenica enclave was easily blockaded by the Bosnian Serb forces of Colonel General Ratko Mladić, isolating the Dutch battalion, causing serious deficiencies in provisions. When VRS (Army of Republika Srpska) artillery squashed the resistance of the ARBiH (Army of the Republic of Bosnia and Herzegovina) 28ª Mountain Infantry Division that was defending the town, Lieutenant-Colonel Karremans made an urgent request for air support from the United Nations for two Dutch F-16s to attack the heavy armour of the VRS. The attack never took place. It was allegedly cancelled when Serb forces threatened to execute 50 members of Dutchbat III who had been seized as hostages.
On 8 July, a Dutch YPR-765 armored vehicle took fire from the Serbs and withdrew. A group of Bosniaks demanded that the armored vehicle stay to defend them,and established a makeshift barricade to prevent its retreat. As the armored vehicle continued to withdraw, a Bosniak farmer who was manning the barricade threw a hand grenade onto it and subsequently killed Dutch soldier Raviv van Renssen.

During the third 'rotation', "Dutchbat III", commanded by Lieutenant Colonel Thomas Karremans, Mladić's soldiers took the town on 11 July 1995, causing the displacement of many of the city's inhabitants. About 15,000 displaced persons undertook the flight towards Tuzla on foot, but the majority looked for protection from the UN blue helmets in Potočari.

Mladić met with Lt. Col. Karremans and there it was agreed that the enclaves would be handed over to the VRS. Under the pretext of evacuating the Bosniak population to a sheltered city, most of the women and children were transferred by bus to a zone under Bosnian Serb control. The Serbs assured Karremans that the men would be transferred later. But instead, the Serbs proceeded to massacre Srebrenica's male population of approximately 8,373 Bosniaks of different ages. On 21 July, with the entire zone already under the control of the VRS, the Dutch battalion left the enclave.

From July until November 1995 Dutchbat IV served and mainly dealt with refugees at Simin Han, near Tuzla.

Consequences

This incident had great impact on public opinion in the Netherlands. An official seven-year investigation of the incident by the Netherlands Institute for War Documentation resulted in the report Srebrenica: a ‘safe’ area, published April 10, 2002, which resulted in the resignation of Prime Minister Wim Kok six days later. The 3,400-page report criticized the political and military High Commands of the Netherlands as being guilty of criminal negligence, for not preventing the massacre. The conclusions were devastating:

The mission was not suitably prepared.
 There was no coordination between the Ministry of Defence (under Joris Voorhoeve) and the Ministry of Foreign Affairs (under Hans van Mierlo).
 The contingent did not receive sufficient means to accomplish the mission. Adequate firepower and Forward Air Controllers (FACS) to direct air attacks were missing.
 The non-Dutch in charge of air support refused to give aid as requested by Karremans.
 The Dutch soldiers and the UN did not perform their duty.

The report has been referred to by international media. The Institute for War and Peace Reporting has labelled the report "controversial".

On 4 December 2006, Minister of Defence Henk Kamp gave a remembrance insignia to the soldiers of Dutchbat III, draaginsigne DBIII. This award was severely criticized by the public as well as by some survivors and relatives of Srebrenica victims. 
In June 2007 an association of relatives of the victims of the massacre presented a denunciation in The Hague against the Government of the Netherlands and the UN for its negligence in the massacre. In October of the same year, twelve former members of DUTCHBAT III visited the Memorial for the Srebrenica massacre, paying tribute to the victims. The same group of relatives opposed their act of atonement to open dialogue.

The According to testimonies of 171 of the members of the battalion, 65% left the Army, 40% of these requested psychological treatment, and 10% show symptoms of post-traumatic stress disorder (official figure; health professionals treating these people deem the number much higher).

References

External links 
The report's web page 
Full Report 
NU report 

Bosnian War
Srebrenica massacre
Military history of the Netherlands
Military units and formations of the Netherlands
Bosnian genocide